KSTK is a non-commercial radio station in Wrangell, Alaska, broadcasting on 101.7 FM. The station airs public radio programming from the National Public Radio network and the BBC World Service. The station also airs some locally originated programming.

KSTK is a member of CoastAlaska.

Translators

External links
KSTK official website

STK
STK
NPR member stations
Radio stations established in 1973
1973 establishments in Alaska